Werner Lambersy (16 November 1941 – 18 October 2021) was a Belgian poet.

Biography
Lambersy was born in Antwerp to a Jewish mother and Flemish father. During World War II, his father was involved with the Schutzstaffel and went to prison after the war. Therefore, Lambersy grew up without a father figure in his life. This family background influenced much of his poetic work.

Throughout his career, Lambersy wrote nearly seventy books and was considered a major player in French literature. He served as literary attaché for Belgian literature at the Centre Wallonie-Bruxelles de Paris until 2002.

Lambersy died in Paris on 18 October 2021 at the age of 79.

Works
Caerulea (1967)
À cogne-mots (1968)
Haute Tension (1969)
Temps festif (1970)
Silenciaire (1971)
Moments dièses (1972)
Groupes de résonances (1973)
Protocole d'une rencontre (1975)
Maîtres et Maisons de thé (1979)
Le Déplacement du fou (1982)
Paysage avec homme nu dans la neige (1982)
Géographies et Mobiliers (1985)
Komboloï (1985)
Noces noires (1987)
L'Arche et la cloche (1988)
Un goût de champignon après la pluie (1988)
Architecture nuit (1992)
L'écume de mer est souterraine (1993)
Le Nom imprononçable du suave (1993)
Anvers ou les anges pervers (1994)
Front de taille (1995)
Étés (1997)
12 poèmes ventriloques (1998)
La Légende du poème (1998)
Errénité (1999)
Dites trente-trois, c'est un poème (2000)
Ecce homo (jeu-parti) (2002)
À feu ouverts (2004)
Rubis sur l'ongle (2005)
Le Roi Berdagot : farce en sept tableaux (2005)
L'Invention du passé : 1971-1977 (2005)
Coïmbra (2005)
Achill Island note book (2006)
Parfums d'apocalypse (2006)
La Toilette du mort (2006)
Corridors secrets (2007)
Jacques Zabor (2008)
Impromptu de la piscine des amirau (2008)
Te spectem (2009)
Quelque chose qui lui parlait tambours (2009)
La Percée du jour (2009)
Érosion du silence (2009)
Devant la porte (2009)
Pluies noires (2010)
Conversation à l'intérieur d'un mur (2011)
Un concert d'Archie Shepp (2011)
À l'ombre du Bonsaï (2012)
Quelques petites choses à murmurer à l'oreille des mourants (2012)
Le Cahier romain (2012)
Pina Bausch (2013)
Opsimath : la nuit (2013)
L'Assèchement du Zuiderzee (2013)
Le Mangeur de nèfles : haïkus libres (2014)
Déluges et autres péripéties (2014)
Dernières nouvelles d'Ulysse (2015)
Escaut ! Salut: suite zwanzique et folkloresque (2015)
In angulo cum libro (2015)
Dernières nouvelles d'Ulysse : avis de recherche (2015)
Un requiem allemand 1986 (2015)
La Perte du temps (2015)
La Dent tombée de montagne (2015)
Anvers ou Les anges pervers (2015)
Epitapheïon (2016)
D'un bol comme image du monde (2016)
Vie et mort du sentiment étrange d'être dieu (2017)
Le Sous-marin de papier (2017)
Lettres à un vieux poète (2017)
Hommage à Calder (2017)
La Chute de la grande roue (2017)
Ball-trap (2017)
Bureau des solitudes (2018)
Maîtres et maisons de thé (2019)
La Musique à bouche (2019)
Le grand poème (2019)
L'Agendada (2019)
Brainxit (2019)
Les Convoyeurs attendent, journal sauvage (2020)
Le festin de vivre (2020)

References

1941 births
2021 deaths
21st-century Belgian poets
Flemish poets
Belgian people of Jewish descent
Belgian writers in French
20th-century Belgian poets
Belgian male poets
Writers from Antwerp